The United States National Cemetery System is a system of 164 cemeteries in the United States and its territories. The authority to create military burial places came during the American Civil War, in an act passed by the U.S. Congress on July 17, 1862.  By the end of 1862, 12 national cemeteries had been established.  A national cemetery is generally a military cemetery containing the graves of U.S. military personnel, veterans and their spouses, but not exclusively so. The best-known national cemetery is Arlington National Cemetery in Arlington County, Virginia, adjacent to Washington, D.C. Some national cemeteries, especially Arlington, have graves of civilian leaders and other national figures. Some national cemeteries also contain sections for Confederate soldiers.  In addition to national cemeteries, there are also state veteran cemeteries.

National Cemetery Administration
The National Cemetery Administration of the United States Department of Veterans Affairs (VA) maintains 148 national cemeteries as well as the Nationwide Gravesite Locator, which can be used to find burial locations of American military veterans through their searchable website. The Department of the Army maintains 2 national cemeteries, Arlington National Cemetery and United States Soldiers' and Airmen's Home National Cemetery. The National Park Service (NPS) maintains 14 national cemeteries associated with historic sites and battlefields.

The American Battle Monuments Commission, an independent agency, maintains 26 American military cemeteries and other memorials outside the United States.

History
The first national cemeteries were set up after the United States Civil War by Edmund Burke Whitman. Congress passed a law to establish and protect national cemeteries in 1867.

Final military honors are provided for qualified veterans by volunteer veteran or National Guard details known as Memorial Honor Details (MHD), upon application by family members through their choice of mortuary handling the deceased.

List of United States national cemeteries

See also
Fort Leavenworth Military Prison Cemetery
USVA emblems for headstones and markers
List of military tombstone abbreviations

Notes and references

Further reading
Bontrager, Shannon. Death at the Edges of Empire: Fallen Soldiers, Cultural Memory, and the Making of an American Nation, 1863–1921 (University of Nebraska Press, 2020); memories of American war dead. online summary by author

External links
Department of Veteran's Affairs, National Cemetery Administration

 
National Cemetery
National Cemetery